{{DISPLAYTITLE:C3H5NO2}}
The molecular formula C3H5NO2 (molar mass: 87.08 g/mol, exact mass: 87.0320 u) may refer to:

 Glycidamide
 2-Oxazolidone
 Dehydroalanine, or 2-aminoacrylate